Nicholas Brown is an Australian rules football umpire currently officiating in the Australian Football League.

He joined the Victorian Football League in 2010, umpiring in the 2014 Grand Final. He was appointed to the AFL list in 2015 and made his debut in Round 9 of that year, in a match between Hawthorn and Gold Coast. He left the AFL list at the end of the 2016 season, but returned for the 2018 season.

References

Living people
Australian Football League umpires
Place of birth missing (living people)
Year of birth missing (living people)